Push It may refer to:
 "Push It" (Salt-n-Pepa song), 1987
 "Push It" (Garbage song), 1998
 "Push It" (Static-X song), 1999
 "Push It" (Rick Ross song), 2006
 "Push It", a song by NLE Choppa featuring Young Thug from the mixtape  Me vs. Me

See also
 
 "Pushit" (song), a 1996 song by Tool